Rebecca Reynolds Tickell (née Harrell; born March 2, 1980) is a producer, director, actress, singer, and environmental activist.

Acting career 
Rebecca Harrell appeared in the Christmas film Prancer. She garnered a Young Artist Award nomination for Best Young Actress Starring in a Motion Picture. Movie critic Roger Ebert wrote of her performance that "what really redeems the movie, taking it out of the category of kiddie picture and giving it a heart and gumption, is the performance by a young actress named Rebecca Harrell, as Jessica. She's something. She has a troublemaker's look in her eye, and a round, pixie face that's filled with mischief. And she's smart—a plucky schemer who figures out things for herself and isn't afraid to act on her convictions".

She appeared in other films before putting her acting career aside to focus on environmental activism. She has been interviewed on Today, and by The New York Times, the Los Angeles Times, and The Washington Post.

Environmental activist and filmmaker 
In 2010, with husband Josh Tickell, Harrell Tickell documented the BP oil spill disaster in the Gulf of Mexico for their film The Big Fix. The film premiered as an "Official Selection" at the 2011 Cannes Film Festival. She became sick during the making of this film due to exposure to the mixture of oil and Corexit, which resulted in an irreversible skin condition.

The film received positive reviews, earning an 86% rating on the Rotten Tomatoes website. The New York Times compared the film to Silkwood and described The Big Fix as "an enraged exposé of the crimes of Big Oil". The Village Voice wrote, "The film's scope is staggering, including its detailed outlining of BP’s origins and fingerprints across decades of unrest in Iran. By doing smart, covert reporting that shames our news media, by interviewing uncensored journalists, by speaking with locals whose health has been destroyed, and by interviewing scientists who haven’t been bought by BP (many have, as the film illustrates), Fix stretches into a mandatory-viewing critique of widespread government corruption".

Traveling across the country, the Tickells educate people on different environmental issues, focusing on solutions, mainly algae-based biofuel. Their production company, Green Planet Productions, makes feature-length films and also specializes in video-centered campaigns for eco-minded companies and organizations.

She met her future husband while producing their first documentary film Fuel, which won the 2008 Sundance Film Festival Audience Award for Best Documentary and was shortlisted for the Academy Awards. The film also won awards from the Sedona, Santa Cruz, Clarion, AFI Dallas, and Gaia film festivals. She wrote and performed the song "Drive" for the film, which was shortlisted for a 2009 Academy Award for Best Original Song.

In 2014, Harrell Tickell directed and produced the documentary film Pump, which the Los Angeles Times reviewed as "well reasoned and compelling".  A Bloomberg Business editor posited that "This is the second feature about ending America's dependence on oil from the wife-husband team of Rebecca Harrell Tickell and Josh Tickell. They're tub-thumpers, but not shrill...what the Tickells have to share is valuable." The Tickells made a documentary about the 2016 Dakota Access Pipeline construction and associated protests on the Standing Rock Indian Reservation. On Common Ground was released in Jan. 2023.

Algae gasoline 
The Tickells drove the first car powered by a blend of algae gasoline across America. The car was dubbed the "Algaeus" and got 150 miles per gallon because of its extended battery pack and plug. The gasoline engine was unmodified. "We really view it, not to sound grandiose, as an Apollo mission for algae and renewable fuel" Harrell Tickell told Scientific American. With their convoy of alternatively powered vehicles, they drove across the country educating people about different green energy solutions.

I'll Be The One Organization 
Harrell Tickell co-founded the I'll Be The One Organization, a national non-profit with the vision of "clean air, clean food, and clean water for all, through shifting energy". It is dedicated to education and media around sustainable energy. Sir Richard Branson and Steve Howard  participated in the launch of I'll Be The One's Green Curriculum for schools during New York City's Climate Week.

References

External links

1980 births
Living people
American film actresses
American child actresses
American environmentalists
American women environmentalists
People from Hinesburg, Vermont
People from Lancaster, Ohio
Activists from Ohio
21st-century American women